In 2008, Brunei Darussalam began its new journey towards Wawasan Brunei 2035 (Vision Brunei 2035), its national vision, in which by 2035, the country aspires to be recognised for its educated, highly skilled and accomplished people, with a high quality of life and a dynamic, sustainable economy. This Vision guides Brunei Darussalam’s development strategies and policies, which have also incorporated sustainable development perspectives.

References

External links 
 Video on Youtube

Economy of Brunei